Qatar has an embassy in Kuwait City, and Kuwait has an embassy in Doha. Both countries are part of the Middle East region and share close cultural and historical ties.

History 
In 1990, at the beginning of the Gulf War, Qatar was among the Arab countries to condemn Iraq's occupation of Kuwait. It also pledged military support to Kuwait. Qatari soldiers participated in the Battle of Khafji, the first major ground engagement in the Gulf War.

Amir Sabah Al-Sabah was recognized as chief mediator of the 2017 Qatari diplomatic crisis. Kuwait's neutrality and good relations with both parties were the main reasons behind its status as mediator.

In 2020, Qatar and Kuwait signed a 15-year sale and purchase agreement for the supply of up to 3 million tonnes of liquefied natural gas to Kuwait per year.

References

 
Qatar
Kuwait